The McCart Fire Lookout, near Sula, Montana, was built in 1939.  It was listed on the National Register of Historic Places in 1996.

It was named for Bill McCart, a longtime National Forest Service employee in the East Fork District (now Sula District).

References

Fire lookout towers on the National Register of Historic Places in Montana
National Register of Historic Places in Ravalli County, Montana
Buildings and structures completed in 1939
Bitterroot National Forest